Hannah Angela Kearney (born February 26, 1986) is an American mogul skier who won a gold medal at the 2010 Winter Olympics and a bronze medal at the 2014 Winter Olympics.

Personal life
Kearney was born in Norwich, Vermont to Jill (née Gass) and Tom Kearney. They met while attending McGill University in Montreal, Quebec. She grew up and still lives in Norwich, Vermont. Kearney graduated from Hanover High School. Her mother is active in promoting youth sports as the director of the Town of Norwich Recreation Department. Kearney studied at Dartmouth College as a member of the class of 2015.

In her free time, Kearney likes to ride horses, knit, play soccer, read, and watch her brother Denny play hockey. She considers herself "half-Canadian" because her mother grew up in Montreal and she has relatives living in Vancouver and Montreal.

Career

2006 Winter Olympics

A gold medal favorite entering her first Olympics, Kearney had a poor first run and did not make it out of the qualification round. She stumbled after landing her first jump. Her score of 20.80 points put her in 10th at that point, with 20 skiers left to compete. After the second-to-last skier, she was officially bumped out of the top 20, the ranking she would have needed to advance to the final.

2010 Winter Olympics

In December 2009, Kearney won the US Olympic trial event at Steamboat, earning a spot on the US Team.

At the 2010 Winter Olympics, Kearney entered the final round with a qualification score of 25.96.  As a result of having the best qualifying score, Kearney would be the last skier to ski in the final round. Fellow teammate Shannon Bahrke was in second place, and Canadian Jennifer Heil was in first, with scores of 25.43 and 25.69 respectively.  Kearney skied a clean run, earning a score of 26.63 and winning the gold medal.

2014 Winter Olympics

At the 2014 Winter Olympics, Kearney entered the final round with a qualification score of 21.93   As a result of having the best qualifying score, Kearney would be the last skier to ski in the final round. Canadian sisters Chloé Dufour-Lapointe was in second place and Justine Dufour-Lapointe was in third, with scores of 21.70 and 21.64 respectively.  Kearney faltered slightly after the first jump, earning a score of 21.49 to win the bronze medal.

World Cup results

Season titles
10 titles (4 overall freestyle, 6 moguls)

References

 
 Vancouver Olympic Games profile: Hannah Kearney

External links
 
 
 
 
 
 

1986 births
American female freestyle skiers
American people of Canadian descent
Freestyle skiers at the 2006 Winter Olympics
Freestyle skiers at the 2010 Winter Olympics
Freestyle skiers at the 2014 Winter Olympics
Living people
Medalists at the 2010 Winter Olympics
Medalists at the 2014 Winter Olympics
Olympic bronze medalists for the United States in freestyle skiing
Olympic freestyle skiers of the United States
Olympic gold medalists for the United States in freestyle skiing
People from Hanover, New Hampshire
People from Norwich, Vermont
Sportspeople from New Hampshire
Sportspeople from Vermont
21st-century American women